This article serves as an index – as complete as possible – of all the honorific orders or similar decorations awarded by Croatia, classified by Monarchies chapter and Republics chapter, and, under each chapter, recipients' countries and the detailed list of recipients.

Awards

Monarchies 
European monarchies

British Royal Family 

HM The Queen :  12 December 2001 - Member with Sash and Grand Star of the Grand Order of King Tomislav

Norwegian Royal Family 
See also decorations pages (mark °) : Harald, Sonja, Haakon, Mette-Marit, Mârtha Louise, Astrid & Ragnhild

 Harald V of Norway: Grand Order of King Tomislav°
 Queen Sonja of Norway: Grand Order of Queen Jelena°

Swedish Royal Family   
They have been awarded :

To be complete if any ...

Dutch Royal Family 

 Princess Beatrix of the Netherlands : Grand Cross with Cordon of the Order of the Stara Planina (1999)

Belgian Royal Family 

To be complete if any ...

Luxembourgish Grand-Ducal Family 

To be complete if any ...

Spanish Royal Family 

To be complete if any ...

Monegasque Princely Family 

 Albert II, Prince of Monaco : Knight Grand Cross of the Grand Order of King Tomislav (7 April 2009)

Liechtenstein's  Princely Family 

To be complete if any ...

Republics 

to be completed

References 

 
Croatia